Liberty Lobby was a far-right think tank and lobby group founded in 1958 by Willis Carto. Carto was known for his promotion of antisemitic conspiracy theories, white nationalism, and Holocaust denial.

The organization produced a daily five-minute radio show called This is Liberty Lobby, which was broadcast on the Mutual Broadcasting System and other radio stations. At the conclusion of each show, listeners were invited to get a copy of its "America First" pamphlet.

History 
Liberty Lobby described itself as "a pressure group for patriotism; the only lobby in Washington, D.C., registered with Congress which is wholly dedicated to the advancement of government policies based on our Constitution and conservative principles." According to Chip Berlet, Liberty Lobby presented itself as "a patriotic populist organization seeking to restore constitutional safeguards and national sovereignty" and said that it "consistently [denied] that it [was] the least bit antisemitic, much less neofascist or quasinazi". 

Carto's Noontide Press republished Francis Parker Yockey's Imperium: The Philosophy of History and Politics, and also published a number of other books and pamphlets promoting a racialist and white supremacist world view, and Liberty Lobby in turn sold and promoted these books.

While Liberty Lobby was intended to occupy a niche as a conservative anti-Communist group, Carto was meanwhile forming other organizations which would take a much more explicit neo-Nazi orientation. Among these was the National Youth Alliance in 1968, that in early 1970s became the National Alliance. Eventually Carto lost control of this organization, which fell into the hands of William Luther Pierce. Carto founded the Institute for Historical Review by 1978, a group known for publishing Holocaust denial books and articles. As with the National Youth Alliance and Noontide Press, the Institute for Historical Review fell out of Carto's hands in a hostile internal struggle. Liberty Lobby, however, remained under the control of Carto until it was disbanded in 2001.

During the 1968 United States presidential election Liberty distributed a pro-Wallace pamphlet entitled "Stand up for America" despite the campaign's denial of such a connection. 

During the 1970s, as the anti-Communism of the 1950s and 1960s fell out of favor, Carto redefined the public image of Liberty Lobby, and began to describe it as a politically populist organization, rather than conservative or right-wing. Liberty Lobby also tried to create connections to the American political left by redistributing a report critical of President Jimmy Carter authored by frequent third-party presidential candidate Lyndon LaRouche and his NCLC.

Liberty Lobby was infiltrated by journalist Robert Eringer, who wrote about the organization in Mother Jones in 1981. The organization campaigned against the ratification of the Genocide Convention.

The Spotlight 

In 1975, Liberty Lobby began publishing a weekly newspaper called The Spotlight, which ran news and opinion articles with a very populist and anti-establishment slant on a variety of subjects, but gave little indication of being extreme-right or neo-Nazi. However, critics charged The Spotlight was intended as a subtle recruiting tool for the extreme right, using populist-sounding articles to attract people from all points on the political spectrum including liberals, moderates, and conservatives, and special-interest articles to attract people interested in such subjects as alternative medicine. Critics also charged the newspaper with subtly incorporating antisemitic and white racialist undertones in its articles, and with carrying advertisements in the classified section for openly neo-Nazi groups and books. The Washington Post described The Spotlight as "a newspaper containing orthodox conservative political articles interspersed with anti-Zionist tracts and classified advertisements..."

The Spotlight's circulation peaked around 200,000 in the early 1980s, and although it experienced a steady drop after that, it continued to be published until the Liberty Lobby's demise in 2001.

Liberty Lobby founded The Barnes Review in 1994.

Demise 

In 2001, Liberty Lobby and Carto lost a civil lawsuit brought by a rival far-right group which had earlier gained control of the Institute for Historical Review, and the ensuing judgment for damages bankrupted the organization. Carto and others who had been involved in publishing The Spotlight have since started a new newspaper, the American Free Press, which is very similar in overall tone to The Spotlight. , the  political organization called Liberty Lobby remains defunct.

Views

Antisemitism
Liberty Lobby described itself as a conservative political organization.

Evidence for the antisemitic stance of Liberty Lobby began to mount when numerous letters by Carto excoriating the Jews (and blaming them for world miseries) began to surface, which included statements such as  "How could the West [have] been so blind. It was the Jews and their lies that blinded the West as to what Germany was doing.  Hitler's defeat was the defeat of Europe and America."  Carto's letters eventually became the subject of a federal civil lawsuit. There were several other defamation lawsuits arising from publications that described Liberty Lobby as anti-semitic or racist, but it appears that Liberty Lobby never won any of these cases.

Other evidence of the group's antisemitic views includes the charge that the group's file cabinets contained extensive pro-Nazi and Ku Klux Klan literature.  In 1969, True magazine ran a story by Joe Trento, titled "How Nazi Nut Power Has Invaded Capitol Hill".

Repatriation of blacks back to Africa

Beginning in October 1966 two American journalists, Drew Pearson and Jack Anderson, published a series of stories in their widely-syndicated "Washington Merry-Go-Round" column which recounted the findings of a former employee, Jeremy Horne. Horne said he had discovered a box of correspondence between Carto and numerous government officials establishing the Joint Council of Repatriation (JCR), a forerunner organization to the Liberty Lobby. The JCR stated that their fundamental purpose was to "repatriate" blacks "back to Africa". Ex-Mississippi Supreme Court Justice Thomas Pickens Brady and various members of the White Citizens' Councils who had worked to establish the JCR contributed to the founding of Liberty Lobby. Other correspondence referred to U.S. Congressional support for the emerging Liberty Lobby, such as from South Carolina Senator Strom Thurmond (Dixiecrat presidential candidate in 1948) and California U.S. Representative James B. Utt.

Pearson reported that Utt, as well as Congressman John M. Ashbrook, Ellis Yarnal Berry, W. Pat Jennings and William Jennings Bryan Dorn, received "Statesman of the Republic" award from Liberty Lobby for their "right-wing activities".

The Liberty Lobby sued for libel based on the stories in a case decided in 1986 by the U.S. Supreme Court, Anderson v. Liberty Lobby, Inc.  The case was the most quoted Supreme Court precedent in 1997 because it established the guidelines for issuing summary judgment to end frivolous lawsuits.

See also
 Curtis B. Dall (a former Chairman of Liberty Lobby)
 Far right
 Racism
 Right-wing populism

References

Further reading
 Frank P. Mintz, The Liberty Lobby and the American Right: Race, Conspiracy, and Culture. Westport, CT: Greenwood Press, 1985.

External links
 "Why Did the Spotlight and Liberty Lobby Attack Real Anti-Communists?" by Larry McDonald, from the Congressional Record

Advocacy groups in the United States
American conspiracy theorists
Anti-communist organizations in the United States
1958 establishments in the United States
Organizations disestablished in 2001
Neo-Nazi organizations in the United States